The Oklahoma Democratic Party is an Oklahoma political party affiliated with the Democratic Party. 

The party dominated local politics in Oklahoma almost since the days of early statehood in 1907 to 1994. In national politics, the party became a dominant force beginning with the presidential election of 1932 and the Franklin D. Roosevelt political re-alignment. From 1932 to 1994, the majority of members of Congress from Oklahoma have been Democrats, and of the 27 men and women who have been elected to the office of Governor of Oklahoma, 22 have been Democrats.

However, the party has fared poorly since 1994; Democrats lost five out of six congressional races that year. Since then, they have won only a handful of seats, which they no longer hold. In response, the traditionally disorganized Oklahoma Democrats have taken steps to create a more organized state party, hiring a professional executive director in 1995. Even so, Democrats continued to lose ground in the 2000s, losing control of both the Oklahoma House of Representatives and the Oklahoma Senate. In 2008, Oklahoma gave the lowest percentage of any state's vote to national Democrat Barack Obama in the presidential election.

As of January 15, 2021, there are 748,222 registered Democratic voters in Oklahoma.

In the 2012 general election, the party was successful in defending all incumbents in the Oklahoma Legislature and defeating two Republican House members.

In 2018, Kendra Horn defeated incumbent Republican congressman Steve Russell, to become the first Democrat elected to Congress from Oklahoma since 2010. She lost reelection to Republican challenger Stephanie Bice in 2020.

History

Statehood and the 20th Century
The Oklahoma Democratic Party once dominated state politics for much of Oklahoma history from with its strength in greatest concentrations in Oklahoma's 5th congressional district and the southeastern part of the state.

Upon statehood, all but one of the Congressional seats was held by Democrats. The Democrats won eighteen of the twenty-one gubernatorial elections since its statehood in 1907.  The Democratic Party held on average 81 percent of the seats in the state legislature between 1907 and 1973. With the onset of the Great Depression, the party gained even more influence for several decades

Democratic opposition to deficit spending in the late 1930s marked a growing conservative movement in the party, which led to a 1941 constitutional amendment requiring legislators to pass a balanced budget. 

After the federal Voting Rights Act and congressional reapportionment in Oklahoma in the 1960s, black state lawmakers returned to the Oklahoma Legislature, this time many aligning with the Democratic Party and hailing from Tulsa or Oklahoma City.

Since the 1980s the party has seen a decline as Christian fundamentalists have shifted to the Republican Party. The Democratic Party has not attained more than 41 percent of the vote for president.

21st Century
As of 2000 about 55 percent of Oklahoma voters registered as Democrats. The party continues to decline in strength in both the Oklahoma Legislature and executive branch. For the first time since statehood, Republicans held all statewide-elected offices starting in 2011.

In the 2020 Oklahoma elections, Democrat Mauree Turner became the first Muslim Oklahoma state legislator and the first publicly non-binary U.S. state legislator in the United States.

Electoral history

Note:

Current structure and composition
The Oklahoma Democratic Party headquarters is located North Santa Fe Avenue in Oklahoma City. They host the biennial state conventions in May of odd-numbered years, in which they elect executive officers and delegates to the Democratic National Committee. The Democratic National Committee is responsible for promoting Democratic campaign activities, overseeing the process of writing the national Democratic Platform, and supervising the Democratic National Convention. Delegates serve four-year terms concurrent with presidential elections.

Alicia Andrews, the first African American and African American Woman chair was re-elected June, 2021. Former state Representative, Eric Proctor was elected vice chair. Former Governor David Walters and Kalyn Free are delegates for the Democratic National Committee.

The state party coordinates campaign activities with Democratic candidates and county parties, and officers who correspond with the state's five Congressional districts. In 2005, the Democratic National Committee began a program called the "50 State Strategy" of using national funds to assist all state parties and pay for full-time professional staffers.

The Young Democrats of Oklahoma is the official age 13-35 division of the Oklahoma Democratic Party.

Officers and Staff
Officers:
Chair, Alicia Andrews
Vice Chair, Eric Proctor
Secretary, Nana Dankwa
Treasurer, Rachel Hunsucker

Staff:
Executive Director, Scott J. Hamilton
Communications Director, Angela Allmond
Director of External Relations, David D. Roberts
Operations/Office Manager, Tristen Watkins

Ideology

The Oklahoma Democratic Party is made up of conservative, centrist and liberal members. Less than a third of registered Democratic voters in Oklahoma supported President Barack Obama in 2012, due to the larger proliferation of conservative and centrist members of the party.

Compared to other Democratic factions, Centrist members of the Oklahoma Democratic Party support the use of military force and the use of deadly force in self-defense. They are more willing to reduce government welfare. Many Oklahoma Democrats are socially conservative by supporting the United States pro-life movement and traditional marriage. The Oklahoma Democratic Party tends to support moderate to conservative positions on gun control and open carry.

The Oklahoma Democratic Party held a state convention on May 14, 2011, in which they discussed a number of platform positions. Participants discussed support for public health programs, government-funded embryonic stem cell research, the legalization of medical marijuana, education funding, and opposition to voucher programs that divert tax dollars to private institutions. They also discussed the state party's support of teacher's rights to unionize and policies to protect homeowners from unfair foreclosures. Other party platform positions included support for the elimination of predatory lending practices, support for limitations on credit card interest rates, support for the elimination of the state sales tax on food, support for increasing taxes on the wealthiest citizens of Oklahoma, and support for reforms to the state criminal justice system. The party's position on gun laws was moderate, stating support for limited, but responsible gun laws. The party also supports continued investments in green energies.

Current elected officials
, the Oklahoma Democratic Party does not have a majority in either house of the state legislature or hold any federal or statewide seats. The last statewide Democratic official in Oklahoma was Superintendent of Public Instruction Joy Hofmeister. Hofmeister switched parties from Republican to Democrat in October 2021 and subsequently left office in January 2023. She was succeeded by Republican Ryan Walters (politician).

Legislative leadership
Senate Minority Leader: Kay Floyd
House Minority Leader: Emily Virgin
House Minority Whip: Mickey Dollens

Democratic Governors 
, there have been a total of 22 Democratic Party Governors.

See also
 Politics of Oklahoma
 U.S. Democratic Party
 Oklahoma Libertarian Party
 Oklahoma Republican Party

References

External links
 Oklahoma Democratic Party

 
Democratic Party (United States) by state
Democratic Party